Eveland Bridge is located southwest of Oskaloosa, Iowa, United States. It carried traffic of Fulton Avenue over the Des Moines River, spanning . After receiving multiple petitions, the Mahaska County Board of Supervisors decided in April 1875 to build a bridge, replacing a ferry service that operated at this point along the river beginning in 1854. They contracted with the Fort Wayne Bridge Works of Fort Wayne, Indiana, to build the new bridge for $25,200. It was designed by C. W. Tracy, a civil engineer. The Whipple through truss span was completed in the summer of 1877. This style was rarely chosen for wagon trusses in Iowa, which means few were built and fewer remain standing. Its deck has subsequently deteriorated and the bridge has been closed to traffic. The Eveland Bridge was listed on the National Register of Historic Places in 1998.

See also
List of bridges documented by the Historic American Engineering Record in Iowa

References

External links

Bridges completed in 1877
Bridges in Mahaska County, Iowa
Truss bridges in Iowa
Historic American Engineering Record in Iowa
National Register of Historic Places in Mahaska County, Iowa
Road bridges on the National Register of Historic Places in Iowa
Whipple truss bridges in the United States
1877 establishments in Iowa